The year 1656 in music involved some significant events.

Events

Publications 
Michel Lambert's first compositions are printed by Ballard.

Classical music 
 Johann Jakob Froberger – Libro quarto di toccate, ricercari, capricci, allemande, gigue, courante, sarabande (presentation manuscript)

Opera 
 William Davenant – The Siege of Rhodes – Composers included Henry Lawes and Matthew Locke

Births 
May 31 – Marin Marais, viol player and composer (died 1728)
September 9 – Johann Caspar Ferdinand Fischer, composer (died 1746)
November 3 – Georg Reutter, theorbo player and composer (died 1738)
date unknown
Jean-Baptiste Moreau, composer (died 1733)
Johann Paul von Westhoff, violinist and composer (died 1705)

Deaths 
June 9 – Thomas Tomkins, composer (born 1572)
July – Michelangelo Rossi, violinist and composer (born 1601 or 1602)
November 6 – King John IV of Portugal, patron of music and the arts, writer on music, and amateur composer
date unknown
Andrea Falconieri, lutenist and composer (born c.1585)
Francesco Turini, organist and composer (born c. 1595)

 
17th century in music
Music by year